Diana Ruslanivna Harkusha (born 5 July 1994), sometimes transliterated as Diana Garkusha, is a Ukrainian lawyer, dancer, as well as pageant titleholder who won third place at Miss Ukraine Universe 2014. She later represented Ukraine at the Miss Universe 2014 pageant, where she placed as the second runner-up.

Early life
In 2011, Harkusha attends the Yaroslav Mudryi National Law University. She graduated from the university on March 2017. Prior to her participation in Miss Ukraine Universe and Miss Universe, she won Miss Artek in 2008, Etnokoroleva Slobozhanshchiny in 2011 and Miss Kharkiv in 2012.

Pageantry

Miss Ukraine Universe 2014
Harkusha competed in Miss Ukraine Universe 2014 represented Kharkiv. The pageant was held on 6 June 2014. At the end of the event, she was announced as the second runner-up.

Miss Universe 2014
The original winner, Anna Andres, resigned and refused to represent the country due to personal reasons. Therefore, Harkusha was selected to represent Ukraine at Miss Universe 2014 pageant. She then became the second runner-up of the pageant, making it the third time that Ukraine has ever made it to the Top 5.

Notes

References

External links
Official Miss Ukraine Universe website
Interview by the Telemundo

1994 births
Living people
Miss Universe 2014 contestants
Actors from Kharkiv
Ukrainian beauty pageant winners
Ukrainian female models